National Highway 217 commonly referred to as NH 217, is a national highway in India. This route was earlier part of old national highways 51 and 62. It is a secondary route of National Highway 17. NH-217 runs through the states of Assam and Meghalaya in India.

Route
NH217 connects Paikan, Tura, Dalu, Baghmara, Rongjeng, Damra and Dudhnoi in the states of Assam and Meghalaya in India.

Junctions  

  Terminal near Paikan.
  near Tura.
  near Lower Nengkhra.
  Terminal near Dudhnoi.

History 
In 2021, a new species of gecko was found on the highway, Cyrtodactylus karsticolus.

See also
 List of National Highways in India
 List of National Highways in India by state

References

External links
 NH 217 on OpenStreetMap

National highways in India
National Highways in Assam
National Highways in Meghalaya